Frederick Blake Jr. is a First Nations Canadian politician, who was first elected to the Legislative Assembly of the Northwest Territories in the 2011 election. He represents the electoral district of Mackenzie Delta.

Biography
Blake lives in Tsiigehtchic, Northwest Territories with his family. His parents, Grace and Frederick Blake, also live in Tsiigehtchic.

Arctic Red River
Blake was Chief for the Arctic Red River Band.

Political career
Blake ran for public office in the 2011 Northwest Territories general election as a candidate in the Mackenzie Delta electoral district. The election was hotly contested due to the opening created by incumbent speaker David Krutko stepping down. Blake defeated four other candidates, including former Northwest Territories Commissioner Glenna Hansen, to win his first term in office.

In February 2013, Blake  asked the Minister of Transportation Dave Ramsay, whether the ferry M.V. Merv Hardie, recently retired from the crossing at Fort Providence after the completion of the Deh Cho Bridge, could replace the MV Louis Cardinal, a smaller and less capable ferry operating at Tsiigehtchic.

He has also served as Gwich'in Chief in the community of Tsiigehtchic.

References

External links

1977 births
Living people
21st-century Canadian politicians
21st-century First Nations people
First Nations politicians
Gwich'in people
Members of the Legislative Assembly of the Northwest Territories
Speakers of the Legislative Assembly of the Northwest Territories